Leif Dag Werneid (born 1943) was a Norwegian professional footballer.

He played as a forward for the Los Angeles Wolves of the North American Soccer League, scoring 4 goals in 21 appearances in the 1968 season. He also played for Lisleby FK.

References

1943 births
Living people
Norwegian footballers
Los Angeles Wolves players
North American Soccer League (1968–1984) players
Norwegian emigrants to the United States
Lisleby FK players
Association football forwards
Norwegian expatriate sportspeople in the United States
Norwegian expatriate footballers
Expatriate soccer players in the United States